Dafne Keen Fernández (born 4 January 2005) is a British-Spanish actress. She made her debut starring as Ana "Ani" Cruz Oliver on the television series The Refugees  from 2014 to 2015, before her breakthrough starring as Laura in the 2017 superhero film Logan, in which she received widespread critical acclaim for her acting. She received several awards, including an Empire Award for Best Newcomer, and nominations for a Critics' Choice Award and a Saturn Award. In 2019, she began starring as Lyra Belacqua in the television series His Dark Materials, for which she was nominated for a BAFTA Cymru.

Early life  
Keen was born in Madrid. She is the daughter of British actor Will Keen, and Spanish actress, theatre director, and writer María Fernández Ache. Her paternal great-grandfather was Edward Curzon, 6th Earl Howe; her aunts are poet Alice Oswald and writer Laura Beatty.

Career 
Keen began acting in 2014, starring alongside her father in the BBC television series The Refugees, where she played Ana "Ani" Cruz Oliver. The show ended in 2015 after one season.  

Two years after her screen debut, and after several auditions, Keen was cast by Marvel Comics in a big-budget Hollywood production; she co-starred with Hugh Jackman in the 2017 superhero film Logan as the mutant Laura, the child clone of Wolverine. The film opened to critical and financial success, and is considered to be one of the best superhero movies of all time. Keen's performance received critical acclaim, and she received several awards and nominations for her performance, which include winning an Empire Award for Best Newcomer, and receiving nominations from the Chicago Film Critics Association, the Saturn Awards, and more.

In 2019, Keen was cast in the lead role of Lyra Belacqua in the BBC/HBO television adaptation of the His Dark Materials trilogy, where she co-stars along with actress Ruth Wilson; her father is also a cast member of the series. The series has a positive reception, and Keen received praise for her performance, with The Hollywood Reporter writing "...this effort nails much of what makes the books pop, and both the special effects and a star-studded cast led by Dafne Keen and Ruth Wilson are in fine form." For the role, she was nominated for a BAFTA Cymru Award for Best Actress in 2020.

In 2020, Keen starred alongside Andy García in the comedy-drama film Ana; the film was originally announced in 2017, but was delayed until 2020. The film opened to mixed reviews, although Keen's performance received praise. Film critic Amari commenting on her "charisma and presence" and wrote how Keen and Garcia "enhance each other's presence to the point you can forgive the film’s shortcomings."

In November 2022, Keen joined the cast of the Star Wars series The Acolyte.

Filmography

Film

Television

Audio

Music videos

Awards and nominations

References

External links 

 

2005 births
Living people
Spanish child actresses
Spanish film actresses
Spanish television actresses
21st-century Spanish actresses
English child actresses
English film actresses
English television actresses
21st-century English actresses
Spanish emigrants to the United Kingdom
Spanish people of English descent
Spanish people of Galician descent
English people of Spanish descent
Dafne